Lee Re (Korean: 이레, born March 12, 2006) is a South Korean actress. She is best known for playing the title character in Hope (2013).

Early life
Born in 2006, Lee is the youngest among a family of one son and two daughters. She attended Sunchang Elementary School in Gwangju, Gahyeon Elementary School in Incheon and Changchon Elementary School in Seoul. She is currently studying at Korean International Christian School in Incheon, which is a private alternative school for Protestants. She passed the Department of Theater and Film at Chung-Ang University in 2023, at the age of 16 made her a freshman two years early.

Career

Lee started her career by working as a model. She made her acting debut in the 2012 TV series Goodbye Dear Wife. She made a very strong impression on her first film appearance, as she played an elementary schooler trying to overcome the trauma of violent sexual aggression in director Lee Joon-ik's 2013 film Hope, for which her acting range was unanimously praised. For her performance in the movie, Lee won the Best Supporting Actress Award at the Beijing International Film Festival. She gained attention for her acting roles in the movies How to Steal a Dog (2014), A Melody To Remember (2016) and drama Six Flying Dragons (2015).

In 2017, she took part in the Korean voice-dubbing of the Japanese animated film Your Name (2016). In 2020, she starred in the film Peninsula, the sequel to the blockbuster zombie film Train to Busan (2016).

Filmography

Film

Television series

Web series

Awards and nominations

References

External links
 
 
 
 

2006 births
Living people
South Korean television actresses
South Korean film actresses
South Korean child actresses
South Korean Protestants
People from Gwangju
South Korean female models
21st-century South Korean actresses